Leptosiaphos amieti, also known commonly as the Cameroon five-toed skink, is a species of lizard in the family Scincidae. The species is endemic to Cameroon.

Etymology
The specific name, amieti, is in honor of Swiss herpetologist Jean-Louis Amiet.

Habitat

Description
L. amieti is reddish brown dorsally, and whitish ventrally. The tail length is 1.5 times SVL.

Reproduction
L. amieti is oviparous.

References

Further reading
Chirio L, LeBreton M (2007). Atlas des reptiles du Cameroun. Paris: Publications scientifiques du Muséum national d'histoire naturelle. 688 pp. . (in French). 
Perret J-L (1973). "Contribution à l'étude des Panaspis (Reptilia, Scincidae) d'Afrique occidentale avec la description de deux espèces nouvelles ". Revue suisse de Zoologie 80 (2): 595–630. (Panaspis amieti, new species, pp. 617–620, Figure 5). (in French).

Leptosiaphos
Skinks of Africa
Reptiles of Cameroon
Endemic fauna of Cameroon
Reptiles described in 1973
Taxa named by Jean-Luc Perret